An Operational Evaluation Unit is a type of "reserve" squadron of the Royal Air Force. OEU squadrons are tasked with evaluating an aircraft's weapons, systems and performance. This is to either assist in bringing the aircraft to an operational capability, or to continually assess how to best utilize the aircraft's capability once its in service. An example of such a squadron is No. 17 Squadron of the RAF.  The Squadron's role as the F-35B Operation Evaluation Unit is being tasked with introducing the JSF aircraft into service with the Royal Air Force. It is equipped with four F35Bs and currently operates from Edwards Air Force Base in the United States.

Current OEUs
F-35B Lightning Joint Strike Fighter
17(R) Squadron RAF
Typhoon & Tornado Force
41(R) Squadron RAF - Test and Evaluation Squadron
ISTAR Force
56(R) Squadron RAF
Transport Force
206(R) Squadron RAF
Joint Helicopter Command Operational Evaluation Unit
No. 22 Squadron RAF

Previous OEUs
AgustaWestland AW101 Merlin
700 Naval Air Squadron - 2000 to 2008.
Strike Attack OEU  - to 2004
F3 OEU 
Air Guided Weapons OEU  - to 2004
Fast Jet & Weapons Operational Evaluation Unit. -2206 to 2010

See also
Operational conversion unit
Lynx OEU

References

Royal Air Force aircraft squadrons
Air force test units and formations